State Route 124 (SR 124) is a 19.19 mile long east-west state highway in West Tennessee. It serves to connect the towns of Greenfield and McKenzie.

Route description

SR 124 begins in Weakley County in Greenfield at an intersection with US 45E/SR 43/SR 54. It heads east along Main Street to pass through downtown and some neighborhoods before leaving Greenfield and continuing east through farmland. The highway then passes through the community of Pillowville, where it has an intersection with SR 190. SR 124 continues east through rural areas to enter McKenzie just shortly before crossing into Carroll County. It enters town on W Magnolia Avenue, where it passes through neighborhoods before turning south and entering downtown along N Stonewall Street. The highway then merges onto Cedar Street and continues southeast through downtown before coming to an intersection with US 79/SR 76. SR 124 continues southeast through neighborhoods before coming to an end at an intersection with SR 22. The entire route of SR 124 is a two-lane highway.

Major intersections

References

124
Transportation in Weakley County, Tennessee
Transportation in Carroll County, Tennessee